Graeme Raymond Storm (born 13 March 1978) is an English professional golfer.

Career
Storm was born in Hartlepool. He learnt his trade at Hartlepool Golf Club, where he still holds the course record of 62. He won The Amateur Championship in 1999 and represented Great Britain & Ireland in the Walker Cup, before turning professional in 2000.

Storm initially had difficulty establishing himself on the European Tour, and took a job in a local cake factory in the off season to help finance his early years as a professional. In 2004 he recorded two wins on the second tier Challenge Tour on his way to fourth in the end of season rankings, and automatic graduation back to the European Tour for 2005. That season he made a major advance by finishing 31st on the European Tour Order of Merit, an improvement of 90 places on his previous best.

In 2007, Storm won his first European Tour event, with a single shot victory at the Open de France ALSTOM. He commented, "It's unbelievable, to be honest. It's an amazing feeling.... Over the last six or seven months I've been thinking that it might never happen. I've been putting too much pressure on myself but hopefully now I can go on to better things." He went on to finish the 2007 season ranked 16th on the Order of Merit.

At the 2007 PGA Championship, Storm led after the first round after shooting a 5-under par 65 at Southern Hills Country Club. However he could not maintain that form and finished in a tie for 62nd.

In June 2009, Storm secured a place in the 2009 Open after two rounds of final qualifying at Sunningdale, he shot a record eight-under 62 on the new course in the morning and ended 10-under.

In 2016, Storm finished 112th in the European Tour standings, one spot and 100 Euros short of regaining his Tour card. Storm regained his Tour card for the twelfth consecutive year after Patrick Reed lost his European Tour privileges for failing to make enough starts at regular (non-majors or WGC) events. It was the second consecutive year a golfer took advantage of another losing his privileges in such a manner, after Ben Evans was awarded a European Tour card for 2016 after Brooks Koepka lost his membership.

84 days after almost losing his card, Storm won the South African Open, beating World Number 2, Rory McIlroy, in a playoff for his 2nd European Tour victory
  
Storm also works with Today's Golfer magazine, writing tips and reviews.

Amateur wins
1994 McGregor Trophy
1996 Carris Trophy, European Junior Championship
1999 The Amateur Championship

Professional wins (4)

European Tour wins (2)

1Co-sanctioned by the Sunshine Tour

European Tour playoff record (1–1)

Challenge Tour wins (2)

Results in major championships

CUT = missed the half-way cut
"T" = tied

Results in World Golf Championships
Results not in chronological order before 2015.

"T" = Tied
Note that the HSBC Champions did not become a WGC event until 2009.

Team appearances
Amateur
European Boys' Team Championship (representing England): 1996
Jacques Léglise Trophy (representing Great Britain & Ireland): 1996
European Youths' Team Championship (representing England): 1998
European Amateur Team Championship (representing England): 1999
Walker Cup (representing Great Britain & Ireland): 1999 (winners)

Professional
Seve Trophy (representing Great Britain & Ireland): 2007 (winners)

References

External links

English male golfers
European Tour golfers
Sportspeople from Hartlepool
1978 births
Living people